Hirose Tanso (広瀬 淡窓) (22 May 1782 in Hita – 28 November 1856) was a neo-Confucian scholar, teacher and Japanese writer.

Born into a wealthy merchant family, Hirose founded in 1801 the Academy Neo-Confucian Kangien (咸宜園). In Hirose's lifetime, the school was attended by 3,000 young Japanese, and until 1871 by more than 4,000 young men came from all over Japan. Among its graduates were Confucian and Buddhist monks, doctors of traditional Chinese medicine and medicine of Western Europe, politicians and administrators, traders, farmers and samurai.

Hirose published an anthology of his poems in 1837, a three-volume edition of his writings was published as TANSO Zenshu (淡窓全集) between 1925 and 1927.

External links
 Marleen Kassel: Tokugawa Confucian Education: The Kangien Academy of Hirose Tansō (1782–1856). SUNY Press, 1996,  preview on Google books

References

1782 births
1856 deaths
19th-century Japanese poets
19th-century Japanese educators
Japanese male poets
19th-century Japanese historians
19th-century Japanese philosophers